Lobogenesis larana is a species of moth of the family Tortricidae. It is found in Venezuela. The habitat consists of cloud forests.

The length of the forewings is 5.2-5.8 mm for males and 6.5–7 mm for females. The forewings are pale whitish with brown striae and reticulations (a net-like pattern). The hindwings are pale whitish grey with darker grey-brown mottling.

Etymology
The species name refers to the Venezuelan state of Lara.

References

Moths described in 2000
Euliini